The Carrizo Badlands are a landform of badlands that lie within Anza-Borrego Desert State Park in eastern San Diego County, and in the Carrizo Impact Area in western Imperial County, in Southern California.

Geography
The badlands lie south of the Vallecito Mountains and Fish Creek Mountains, and north of the Tierra Blanca Mountains and Coyote Mountains.  

The Carrizo Badlands are bisected by the Carrizo Valley, created by the erosion of the badlands by Carrizo Creek, and ending in the Carrizo Wash, 3 miles east of the site of the old Carrizo Creek Station. Vallecito Creek is a major tributary of Carrizo Creek.

Features
One of the features within the Carrizo Badlands are the Mud Caves in Arroyo Tapiado.

References

Anza-Borrego Desert State Park
Landforms of Imperial County, California
Landforms of San Diego County, California